These are the Kowloon East results of the 1998 Hong Kong legislative election. The election was held on 24 May 1998 and all 3 seats in Kowloon East where consisted of Wong Tai Sin District and Kwun Tong District were contested. The Szeto Wah-led Democratic Party won two seats, with Fred Li got elected, while Chan Yuen-han of the Democratic Alliance for the Betterment of Hong Kong was also elected.

Overall results
After election:

Candidates list

See also
Legislative Council of Hong Kong
Hong Kong legislative elections
1998 Hong Kong legislative election

References

1998 Hong Kong legislative election